Carlos Santana & Buddy Miles! Live! is a live album by Carlos Santana and Buddy Miles, released in 1972.

Track listing

Personnel 

 Buddy Miles – vocals, drums, percussion, congas
 Carlos Santana – guitar, vocals
 Neal Schon – guitar
 Bob Hogins – organ, electric piano
 Ron Johnson – bass guitar
 Greg Errico – drums
 Richard Clark – drums, percussion, congas
 Coke Escovedo – drums, percussion, timbales
 Mike Carabello – percussion, congas
 Mingo Lewis – percussion
 Victor Pantoja – percussion, congas
 Hadley Caliman – flute, saxophone
 Luis Gasca – trumpet

Chart performance

References

External links 
 Carlos Santana & Buddy Miles! Live! (1972) album releases & credits at Discogs.com
 Carlos Santana & Buddy Miles! Live! (1972) album credits & user reviews at ProgArchives.com

Albums produced by Carlos Santana
Buddy Miles albums
1972 live albums
Carlos Santana live albums
Columbia Records live albums